NH7 Weekender is an annual, multi-city and multi-genre, music and comedy festival held in India. It is created by Only Much Louder (OML) and is among the largest South Asian arts festivals. It began in Pune, Maharashtra, India, as a three-day, multi-genre, music festival in 2010. Since 2012 it has expanded to multiple cities. In 2017, the lineup added comedy. Its title sponsor has been Bacardi since inception.

The festival is held between October and December, and hosted in multiple cities alongside its flagship event in Pune. Delhi NCR, Bengaluru, Kolkata, Hyderabad, and Shillong have host the festival. The lineup includes a mix of, established and emerging, sub-continental and global artists.

History 
In 2006, Vijay Nair, the co-founder and ex-CEO of OML, began formulating the idea of an Indian multi-genre music festival modeled after the Glastonbury where he had taken Pentagram in 2005. In 2009 he met UK music manager Stephen Budd in Mumbai and they discussed the idea of creating an independent music festival. Nair came to London where Budd introduced him to Glastonbury booker Martin Elbourne and the three subsequently planned and financed the first NH7 Weekender.

The debut festival was held in Pune, in 2010, and was produced by OML. It was a three-day festival, had a multi-stage setup and was multi-genre. It was headlined by international artists Asian Dub Foundation, The Magic Numbers, and Reverend and The Makers, along with well established Indian acts including Lounge Piranha, Junkyard Groove, Zero, and Demonic Resurrection.

In 2012 the festival expanded to two cities and alongside Pune added, multi stage and day, festivals in Delhi and Bangalore. Since then, the festival has been held in Kolkata, Meghalaya, Hyderabad and Shillong with smaller, single day, festivals in Mysore, Jaipur, Nagpur and other cities. In 2017, after OML's foray in the comedy business, the festival added a comedy lineup after having previously booked acts like All India Bakchod and Vir Das for musical performances.

The festival is one of the first large scale music festivals in the South Asian sub-continent. Its programming is a mix of Indian independent acts, younger sub-continental artists, and multi-genre international headliners. Initially stages were broadly divided by genres: rock and metal, electronic, and indie and folk. Each stage had two platforms: main and transition, with alternated performances. Over the past few years, the festival has ditched genre stages and headliners perform on the Bacardi Arena main stage.

Past headliners have included: Asian Dub Foundation, Joe Satriani, José González, Mark Ronson, Mogwai, Flying Lotus, The Wailers, A. R. Rahman, Vishal Bhardwaj, Imogen Heap, The Vaccines, Megadeth, Rodrigo y Gabriela, Seun Kuti, DJ Premier, Simian Mobile Disco, Fink, Jon Hopkins, Bombay Bicycle Club, Anoushka Shankar, SBTRKT,  Steven Wilson, Chase & Status, Steve Vai, Nightmares On Wax and others. In August 2019, to celebrate its 10th edition in Pune, where the first NH7 Weekender was held, pre-sale tickets were sold at their 2010 debut price — ₹750 ($10.45; under 21 season tickets) and ₹1500 ($20.90; regular season tickets.)

Parent company sexual harassment allegations 
In 2018, a few former senior management executives at Only Much Louder, the parent company responsible for organizing the festival, were accused of sexual harassment by various female employees, and work associates. This led to a few artistes pulling out of the various festival slots and several others issuing a public stance against it. The company issued a statement and said Vijay Nair had disassociated himself with the company months prior to the allegations becoming public.

Editions

2010 
The festival's debut edition was held from 10–12 December at Koregaon Park in Pune. The lineup had seminal Indian acts like Zero, Swarathma, Pentagram and Blackstratblues alongside international acts like Asian Dub Foundation and The Magic Numbers. The festival had four stages and hosted over 35 artists across three days. It was estimated the festival had 10,000 attendees over the course of three days.

Lineup

2011 
The second edition of NH7 Weekender was held between 18–20 November 2011. It took place at the Laxmi Lawns near Magarpatta City in Pune and grew to five stages. Over 25,000 were estimated in attendance over the three days. Grammy winner Imogen Heap and the British electronic music act Basement Jaxx headlined along with performances from Midival Punditz, The Raghu Dixit Project, and Swarathma.

Lineup

2012 
In its third year, the festival expanded to Delhi and Bangalore. The combined lineup included 200 artists, 60 festival pre-party gigs, and six stages, took place in Delhi, on 13–14 October, at the Buddh International Circuit in Noida; in Pune from 2–4 November at Amanora Park Town; and in Bangalore, at the Embassy International Riding School, on 15–16 December.Headliners included Karnivool, Seun Kuti and Egypt 80, Buraka Som Sistema, Megadeth, Bombay Bicycle Club, Anoushka Shankar, and Fink.

Lineup

2013 
The festival travelled to four cities; Kolkata (14-15 Dec), Pune (28-29 Oct), Bangalore (23-24 Nov) and Delhi NCR (30 Nov – 1 Dec). Headliners included Chase and Status, Textures, Simian Mobile Disco, and MUTEMATH.

Lineup

2014 
The festival travelled to four cities in the span of a month. Starting off with Kolkata (1-2 Nov), Bangalore (8-9 Nov), Pune (21-23 Nov) and Delhi NCR (29-30 Nov). Headliners included The Vaccines, Jon Hopkins, Fear Factory, Luke Sital-Singh, and Amit Trivedi.

Lineup

2015 

Another city, Shillong (23-24 Oct), was added to the festival lineup. After Shillong, the festival travelled to Kolkata from 31 Oct – 1 Nov, followed by Delhi on 28-29 Nov, and in Pune and Bangalore from 4-6 Dec. This was the first year when the festival took place in two cities, Pune and Bangalore, on the same dates. Headliners included A. R. Rahman, Mogwai, Megadeth, Mark Ronson, Rodrigo y Gabriela, Flying Lotus, SBTRKT, and The Wailers.

Lineup

2016 

In 2016, Shillong kicked off the Weekender (21-22 Oct) and saw close to 40,000 people over the weekend. The Weekender traveled to a new city, Hyderabad (5-6 Nov) before culminating in a new venue in Pune, Life Republic in Hinjawadi. The three cities saw a cumulative attendance of over 110,000. Headliners included Steven Wilson, Farhan Akhtar, Shankar Mahadevan, José González, Anoushka Shankar, Patrick Watson, and The Joy Formidable. This year also began the festival's smaller editions in five cities, as day-long festivals, in Kolkata, Puducherry, Mysore, Nagpur and Jaipur.

Lineup

2017 

The eighth edition of the festival began with the a return to the state of Meghalaya between 27 and 28 October. The edition saw over 25,000 attendees, before traveling back to its home city, Pune from 8-10 December, which estimated 45,000 in total attendance.

Headliners included Steve Vai, Textures, The Dillinger Escape Plan, CAS, Marky Ramone, Ram Sampath, and Vishal Bhardwaj. The Dillinger Escape Plan and Textures, both were on a farewell tour. Textures played their last ever show in Pune. Since signing comedians to their roster, OML added a comedy lineup and included Biswa Kalyan Rath, Kanan Gill, All India Bakchod members Rohan Joshi, Tanmay Bhat and Ashish Shakya, Kunal Kamra, Azeem Banatwalla and musical-satire trio Aisi Taisi Democracy among others. There were also nine single-day editions including shows in Kolkata, Bangalore, Jaipur, Puducherry, Indore, Kochi, Goa, Hyderabad and Mysore.

Music lineup

Comedy lineup

2018 
The ninth edition began in Meghalaya, on 2-3 November. It returned to Pune from 7-9 December. Both editions took place in the same venues: Wenfield, The Festive Hills, Meghalaya and Mahalakshmi Lawns, Nagar Road, Pune. Headliners included Joe Satriani, God Is An Astronaut, The Contortionist, Nightmares on Wax, Switchfoot, Poets of The Fall, Salim-Sulaiman, and Shubha Mudgal. An added comedy lineup was also included. In addition to this, there were also 7 single-day editions for the festival in Kolkata, Jaipur, Kochi, Hyderabad, Mysore, Lucknow and Chandigarh.

Music lineup

Comedy lineup

2019 
The 10th edition was held in Jaintia Hills in Meghalaya (1-2 November), and took place in Pune (29 November – 1 December).  In August 2019, to celebrate 10 editions of the music festival in Pune, where the first NH7 Weekender was held, pre-sale tickets were put on sale at the same prices they were sold at in 2010 — ₹750 (under 21 season tickets) and ₹1500 (regular season tickets). Headliners include Opeth, Nick Murphy, Karnivool, Marty Friedman, Kodaline and EarthGang.

Music lineup

Comedy lineup

References 

Music festivals in India
Indian rock music